Kalinino is a rural locality (a village) in Verkhovskoye Rural Settlement, Verkhovazhsky District, Vologda Oblast, Russia. The population was 6 as of 2002.

Geography 
Kalinino is located 22 km southwest of Verkhovazhye (the district's administrative centre) by road. Kostyuninskaya is the nearest rural locality.

References 

Rural localities in Verkhovazhsky District